Neocycloceras is an extinct genus of nautiloid included in the Pseudorthocerida that lived during the Late Devonian and Mississippian (early Carboniferous). Neoclycloceras is characterized by a slender, generally circular shell with slightly oblique, sinuous surficial annulations. Its sutures have dorsal and ventral saddles and lateral lobes and become more oblique with age. Saddles point forward, lobes to the rear. Dorsal saddles are broad and low but the ventral ones are high and conspicuous. The siphuncle is located between the center and venter and is nummuloidal, composed of rounded expanded segments, the inside of which contains a continuous laminar lining that is thickest in the middle of the segments and thinnest at the septal necks. Neocycloceras has been found in Pennsylvania in North America and in Morocco in north Africa.

See also

List of nautiloids
 Nautiloid
 List of prehistoric nautiloid genera

References
 Sweet, W.C.1964. Nautiloidea-Orthocerida; Treatise on Invertebrate Paleontology, Part K: Geol Soc of America and Univ Kansas Press, Teichert & Moore eds.
 Sepkoski, J.J. Jr. 2002. Online Genus Database (CEPHALOPODA) in A compendium of fossil marine animal genera. D.J. Jablonski & M.L. Foote (eds.). Bulletins of American Paleontology 363:1–560.

Prehistoric nautiloid genera
Late Devonian first appearances
Late Devonian animals
Mississippian extinctions